Supercard of Honor XV was a professional wrestling pay-per-view produced by American promotion Ring of Honor (ROH). It took place on April 1, 2022, at the Curtis Culwell Center in Garland, Texas. It was the fourteenth event in the Supercard of Honor chronology, and the first edition since the G1 Supercard in 2019; 2020's planned Supercard of Honor XIV was canceled due to the COVID-19 pandemic. It was also ROH's first live event after a three month hiatus following Final Battle in December 2021, as well as the final event under Sinclair Broadcasting Group ownership (the sale to All Elite Wrestling (AEW) president Tony Khan had not yet been formally finalized).

Twelve matches were contested at the event, including four on the pre-show. In the main event, Jonathan Gresham defeated Bandido in a Winner Takes All match to become the undisputed ROH World Champion. In other prominent matches, Wheeler Yuta defeated Josh Woods in a Pure Wrestling Rules match to win the ROH Pure Championship, Minoru Suzuki defeated Rhett Titus to win the ROH World Television Championship, FTR (Dax Harwood and Cash Wheeler) defeated The Briscoe Brothers (Jay Briscoe and Mark Briscoe) to win the ROH World Tag Team Championship, and Mercedes Martinez defeated Willow Nightingale by submission to become the interim ROH Women's World Championship. This event marked the ROH returns of The Young Bucks (Matt Jackson and Nick Jackson) and Samoa Joe.

Production

Background
On October 27, 2021, ROH announced that they would go on hiatus for the first quarter of 2022 in order to reimagine the company, releasing all their wrestlers and staff from their contracts after their Final Battle event last December; the promotion was expected to resume operations in April 2022. On January 10, 2022, ROH announced their return with Supercard of Honor XV, emanating from the Curtis Culwell Center in Garland, Texas on April 1. 

On March 2, 2022, during All Elite Wrestling (AEW)'s live weekly series, AEW Dynamite, owner & executive Tony Khan announced that he had acquired Ring of Honor from the Sinclair Broadcast Group. As a result, Supercard of Honor XV was the first ROH event produced on Khan's watch.

Storylines
The event will feature professional wrestling matches that involved different wrestlers from pre-existing scripted feuds and storylines. Wrestlers portrayed villains, heroes, or less distinguishable characters in scripted events that built tension and culminated in a wrestling match or series of matches.

At Final Battle, Jonathan Gresham defeated Jay Lethal in an ROH World Championship match, where the original ROH World Title belt was at stake. Gresham was originally suppose to wrestle then-champion Bandido for the title, but Bandido had contracted COVID-19 and was pulled from the show. While Gresham would appear in different promotions defending his championship, Bandido would do the same with his. Both men even defended their respective titles on the first show of Gresham's new promotion, TERMINUS. On January 20, it was announced that at Supercard of Honor XV, Bandido and Gresham would face each other in a championship unification match.

At Final Battle, The Briscoe Brothers (Jay Briscoe and Mark Briscoe) defeated The OGK (Matt Taven and Mike Bennett) to win their record twelfth ROH World Tag Team Championship. However, during their celebration, the Briscoes would be confronted by All Elite Wrestling tag team FTR (Dax Harwood and Cash Wheeler), resulting in the two teams getting into a pull-apart brawl. On February 17, it was announced that the Briscoes would defend the ROH World Tag Team Championship at Supercard of Honor, and their opponents were soon confirmed to be FTR on March 18.

On the January 13 episode of Impact Wrestling's weekly television series, Impact!, AAA Reina de Reinas Champion Deonna Purrazzo defeated ROH Women's World Champion Rok-C in a title vs. title match to claim the latter's title. On April 1, Purrazzo would be booked for the Multiverse of Matches at WrestleCon, which was held on the same night as Supercard of Honor XV. As a result, ROH announced that Willow Nightingale and Mercedes Martinez would face off at Supercard of Honor to determine an interim champion, with the winner facing Purrazzo at a later date in a championship unification match.

Results

See also
2022 in professional wrestling
List of Ring of Honor pay-per-view events

References

2022 in professional wrestling
2022 in Texas
Events in Garland, Texas
Events in Texas
2022
Ring of Honor pay-per-view events
Professional wrestling in Texas
April 2022 events in the United States